Slootdorp is a village in the Dutch province of North Holland. It is a part of the municipality of Hollands Kroon, and lies about 19 km southeast of Den Helder.

The village has recently begun a revitalisation project where municipal owned dwellings to the centre have been replaced with modern homes.

The village is a local hub for farming and a small number of shops. Despite current economic trends, Slootdorp's population has been steadily dwindling.  This has left the now rather quaint township in the ideal position of slowly becoming an enclave for those seeking a "Green Change"

The village is serviced by a number of the districts canals which intersect here.  A number of local businesses still use these canals as the main method of transport of goods.

Gallery

References

Populated places in North Holland
Hollands Kroon